Sakarya may refer to: 

 Sakarya River, a river in central-northwestern Turkey
 Sakarya Province, in Turkey
 Sakarya electoral district, which has seven seats in the Grand National Assembly of Turkey
 Adapazarı, a capital district and the capital city of Sakarya Province in Turkey
 Sakarya gas field, a natural gas field in the Black Sea
 Sakarya University, a public university in Turkey
 Sakarya Sports Hall, a multi-purpose sports venue in Serdivan, Adapazarı, Sakarya Province, Turkey
 Battle of Sakarya, a major battle in the Turkish War of Independence

See also 
 New Sakarya Stadium, Adapazarı